The Fuel Cell Development Information Center (FCDIC) is a Japanese center established in July 1986 to foster exchange of information relating to fuel cell research, development and deployment between its members and thereby accelerate the introduction and penetration of fuel cells into the market.

The FCDIC consists of 154 organizations, 40 academics, and 3 foreign members. The organization publishes the quarterly journal The Journal of Fuel Cell Technology and posts the latest fuel cell news on its web site.

See also
National Institute of Advanced Industrial Science and Technology
New Energy and Industrial Technology Development Organization

References

External links
FCDIC Homepage 

Fuel cells
Trade associations based in Japan